"Esperaré a Que Te Decidas" ("I'll Wait For You to Make a Decision") is a song written by Mary Lauret and performed by Puerto Rican salsa singer Tony Vega on his studio album on his 1996 self-titled studio album  and was released as the lead single from the album. It became his first and (to date) only number one song on the Tropical Airplay chart. It was recognized as recognized as one of the best-performing songs of the year at the 1997 ASCAP Latin Awards on the tropical field.

Charts

Weekly charts

Year-end charts

See also
List of Billboard Tropical Airplay number ones of 1996

References

1996 songs
1996 singles
Tony Vega songs
RMM Records singles